Buddies is a 1985 American drama film. It is the first film to deal with the AIDS pandemic, preceding the television film An Early Frost (also released in 1985).  Directed by Arthur J. Bressan Jr., who died of complications from AIDS two years after the film was released, the film follows a New York City gay man in a monogamous relationship becoming a "buddy" or a volunteer friend to another gay man dying of AIDS and the friendship that develops.  The film stars Geoff Edholm, David Schachter, Billy Lux, and David Rose.

Cast
 Geoff Edholm as Robert Willow
 David Schachter as David Bennett
 Damon Hairston as Gym instructor
 Joyce Korn as Lynn
 Billy Lux as Edward
 David Rose as Steve
 Libby Saines as Mrs. Bennett
 Susan Schneider as Sylvia Douglas
 Tracy Vivat as Nurse

History 
The first widely released Hollywood film to deal with the HIV/AIDS pandemic within the United States was Longtime Companion in 1989.  While news reports about the pandemic began to appear in The New York Times as early as 1981, the fact that many of the initial victims were gay or bisexual men contributed to how Hollywood and society responded. The long-standing taboo within Hollywood about depicting homosexuality played a large role in the refusal of the industry to cinematically deal with the pandemic, when it was initially treated as a "gay disease."  The Celluloid Closet book and documentary film tell the story of that time.

In response to the pandemic, and to Hollywood hypocrisy, Bressan wrote and directed the film Buddies in 1985, and it was shown in a handful of urban, art house movie theaters.

A 2K restoration was released in 2018 on DVD. Screenings were held at San Francisco's Castro Theater (where it had premiered in 1985) on June 21, 2018, and at New York's Quad Cinema starting June 22, 2018.

References 

MSNBC "How Hollywood portrays AIDS"

1985 films
American LGBT-related films
Films directed by Arthur J. Bressan Jr.
Gay-related films
HIV/AIDS in American films
1985 drama films
1985 LGBT-related films
American drama films
LGBT-related drama films
1980s English-language films
1980s American films